Fred J. Shupnik (November 18, 1916 – July 15, 1997) was a former Democratic member of the Pennsylvania House of Representatives.

References

1916 births
1997 deaths
People from Swoyersville, Pennsylvania
Democratic Party members of the Pennsylvania House of Representatives
20th-century American politicians